A lacustuary is a freshwater body of water where river and lake waters mix. Lacustuaries are nonmoving or "slack" water, although water in them can ebb and flow due to lake waves moving in and out, and the rising and falling of lake water levels.

A lacustuary is that portion of a freshwater river or stream where lake water and river/stream water mix. The upper boundary of the lacustuary is that portion of the river directly affected by rising and falling water levels in the lake. Lacustuaries are generally nonmoving or "slack" water.

Lacustuaries are not estuaries. They are far less saline, as lacustuaries are freshwater bodies. Additionally lacustuaries tend to be less saline the closer to the lake, where as estuaries are more saline the closer to the ocean. Lacustuaries also have different functions than estuaries. Their physical and biological characteristics are also much different from the free-flowing water further upstream, and they play important roles in the ecology of both lake and river ecosystems. Lacustuary vegetation is also markedly different from shoreline and upland habitats.

Not all streams which enter a lake have a lacustuary. Man-made ship channels may also be lacustuaries, depending on their slack water status.

Citations
Notes

Citations

Bibliography

Estuaries
Rivers